The Pushihe Pumped Storage Power Station is a pumped-storage hydroelectric power station located  northeast of Dandong in Kuandian County of Liaoning Province, China. It was constructed between August 2006 and September 2012. The power station operates by shifting water between an upper and lower reservoir to generate electricity. The lower reservoir was formed with the creation of the Pushihe Lower Dam on the Pushihe River, a tributary of the Yalu River. The Pushihe Upper Reservoir is located in a valley above the east side of the lower reservoir. During periods of low energy demand, such as at night, water is pumped from Pushihe Lower Reservoir up to the upper reservoir. When energy demand is high, the water is released back down to the lower reservoir but the pump turbines that pumped the water up now reverse mode and serve as generators to produce electricity. The process is repeated as necessary and the plant serves as a peaking power plant.

It was constructed between April 2007 and November 2009.

See also

List of pumped-storage power stations

References

Dams in China
Dams completed in 2009
Gravity dams
Concrete-face rock-fill dams
Hydroelectric power stations in Liaoning
Energy infrastructure completed in 2012
2012 establishments in China
Pumped-storage hydroelectric power stations in China
Underground power stations